

The governor of Sabaragamuwa, Sri Lanka ( Sabaragamuva palāth āndukāravarayā), is responsible for the management of the Sabaragamuwa Provincial Council. Some of the office's key functions include exercising powers vested in the governor by the Provincial Council Act No. 42 of 1987 amended by Act No. 28 of 1990 and the 13th Amendment to the Constitution.

Governors

See also
 List of Chief Ministers of Sri Lanka

References

External links
Sabaragamuwa Provincial Council

Sabarag
Governors of Sabaragamuwa Province